"Fall Breaks and Back to Winter (W. Woodpecker Symphony)" is an instrumental composed by Brian Wilson for American rock band the Beach Boys. Released in 1967 as the third track on the group's album Smiley Smile, the composition derives from "Fire" – a piece recorded by Wilson several months earlier, but left unreleased due to his paranoia.

Composition

"Fall Breaks and Back to Winter (W. Woodpecker Symphony)" is an avant-garde composition with ambient elements, built on an uncertain discordant progression that repeats with a refrain melodically imitating the laugh of the cartoon character Woody Woodpecker, bookended by percussive chimes.  Wilson said of the piece that it was "sort of a song about a cold winter scene. We tried to paint a picture of winter and then spring, late summer, and then broke into winter. We used the Woody Woodpecker theme because it was descriptive to us of spring and summer."

Biographer David Leaf noted its "bizarre woodpecking" percussion, the sentimental use of an accordion to imitate Woody Woodpecker's laugh, and droning wordless vocals by all of the Beach Boys which were originally an element of the shelved composition "The Elements: Fire". Musicologist Daniel Harrison described the piece (along with other Smiley Smile tracks) as "a kind of protomiminal rock music", and that "the lack of formal or harmonic development makes the listener focus upon other quaities such as instrumentation, timbre, and reverberation. A concentrated listening effort thus goes quickly to subtle details."

Legacy
Writer Richard Goldstein characterized "Fall Breaks and Back to Winter" as a precursor to the sound of experimental pop band Animal Collective. In 1996, the instrumental was included in David Toop's Ocean of Sound, a 2-CD compilation album meant to accommodate his book of the same name.

Cover versions

References

1960s instrumentals
Ambient songs
The Beach Boys songs
Songs written by Brian Wilson
Song recordings produced by the Beach Boys